Klindia is a small remote village hidden in the mountains, in the municipal unit of Oleni, Elis, Greece. It lies 2 km northeast of Pefki, 4 km west of Foloi, 4 km east of Agia Anna and 45 km northeast of Pyrgos.

References

Populated places in Elis